Banks ATM Network and Customer Services (BANCS) is an interbank network in India. It was launched on 25 February 2004, with 13 member banks. It is managed by an advisory board consisting of member banks. It is successor to the now-defunct Swadhan ATM network. After the cyber attack by Wannacry several ATM were shut down in Kerala in May 2017

Member banks 

 Bank of Maharashtra
 Bank of Bahrain and Kuwait
 Greater Bombay Co-op Bank
 Centurion Bank
 Central Bank of India
 UTI Bank
 Punjab & Sind Bank
 IDBI Bank Ltd
 RBL Bank
 SBI Commercial & International Bank
 Cosmos Bank
 Air Corporation Employees Co-op Bank
 Saraswat Bank

Technology 

BANCS is supported by the India Switch Company (ISC), acquired by eFunds in 2005, which in turn, was acquired by Fidelity National Information Services. ISC supports BANCS through a mix of VSATs, ISDN, leased lines, CDMA and GPRS. The financial switches used in the system are provided by Oasis Technology Ltd., Mumbai. The software used is from IBM, Solaris and Oracle.

Competitors
 Cashnet
 MITR
 CashTree

References

External links 

 BANCS

Interbank networks in India